The Femina Cup or Coupe Femina was an award of 2000 francs established in 1910 by Pierre Lafitte, the publisher of French women's magazine Femina, to honour women pilots. This French challenge was opened to women aviators only.

About 
The Coupe Femina was awarded to the woman who, by sunset on 31 December each year, had made the longest flight, in time and distance, without landing. In 1910, Belgian pilot Hélène Dutrieu, the first winner, was lifted out of her airplane and carried on the shoulders of the spectators after she landed.  

It is often difficult to determine who the official winner was, since each temporary leader (e.g. Marie Marvingt in 1911) was referred to in several contemporary records as having "won" the cup, only to be superseded by the next temporary record. Thus, in various documents, there are several "winners" recorded for each year, but the formal winners were announced in Femina Magazine. It was first formally awarded to Hélène Dutrieu on 31 December 1910 for her record-breaking non-stop flight. She won it again for the second time in 1911.  

Note: There was also a "Coupe Femina" for women's golf, in this same period.

Winners
 Hélène Dutrieu – 31 December 1910 for a non-stop flight of 167 kilometers in 2 hours 35 minutes
 Hélène Dutrieu won the second time in 1911.
 There was no Coupe Femina competition in 1912.
 Raymonde de Laroche – 25 November 1913 for a non-stop long-distance flight of over 4 hours duration

Editions

See also
 List of awards honoring women
 List of aviation awards

References 

Aviation awards
Business and industry awards honoring women
Awards established in 1910
Women aviators